Shi Cong (born 12 March 2001) is a Chinese artistic gymnast. He competed in the Junior Asian Gymnastics Championships in 2017 and 2018 in Bangkok and Jakarta respectively. In 2017 we won a silver medal with the Chinese junior team. In 2018 He won the gold for the all-around competition as well as two bronzes on high bar and floor exercise. As a senior, he was part of the team sent to compete at the 2021 World Artistic Gymnastics Championships in Kitakyushu. He qualified in 4th in the all-around and placed 6th in the all-around final. He also placed 4th in the parallel bar qualifiers, but was surpassed by his teammates Hu Xuwei and Zhang Boheng and was therefore not able to qualify. After Zhang Boheng won the all-around final, he withdrew from event final competition and Shi Cong was given a spot in the parallel bar final. In the final he went on to win the bronze medal.

References 

2001 births
Living people
Chinese male artistic gymnasts
Gymnasts from Jiangsu
Sportspeople from Jiangsu
Medalists at the World Artistic Gymnastics Championships
21st-century Chinese people